Ministry of Shipping may refer to:
Ministry of Shipping (Bangladesh)
Ministry of Shipping (Greece)
Ministry of Shipping (India)
Ministry of Shipping (Norway)
Ministry of Shipping (United Kingdom)